Austin Ledbetter (born July 15, 1995) is an American retired soccer player who last played for Phoenix Rising FC in the USL Championship.

Career

Early career
A resident of St. Charles, Missouri, Ledbetter attended Christian Brothers College High School in St. Louis, where he was a second team All-State selection as well as a first team All-Metro and All-Conference pick his junior season.

He then played for St. Louis Scott Gallagher Soccer Club, where his club team advanced to the finals of the U.S. Soccer Development Academy Nationals in 2012.

Ledbetter attended Southern Illinois University Edwardsville where he played for the SIU Edwardsville Cougars. He was member of the 2013 Missouri Valley Conference (MVC) All-Freshman Team,\; an honorable mention All-MVC selection in 2014; All-Missouri Valley Conference first team and MVC All-Tournament team selection in 2015; and in 2016, was named both MVC Defensive Player of the Year and MVC Player of the Year as well as the Most Valuable Player of MVC Tournament. He was also team captain in his junior and senior seasons.

In both 2015 and 2016, Ledbetter was a National Soccer Coaches Association of America (NSCAA) All-West Region first team selection.

He also played three seasons in the Premier Development League, with FC Tucson from 2014–15 and for the Des Moines Menace in 2016.

Professional
On January 17, 2017,  Ledbetter  was selected by FC Dallas in the third round of the 2017 Major League Soccer SuperDraft as the 53rd overall pick.

Unsigned by FC Dallas, Ledbetter signed with Saint Louis FC on February 20, 2017.

References

External links

1995 births
Living people
American soccer players
SIU Edwardsville Cougars men's soccer players
Phoenix Rising FC players
FC Tucson players
Des Moines Menace players
Saint Louis FC players
Association football defenders
Soccer players from St. Louis
FC Dallas draft picks
USL League Two players
USL Championship players
USL League One players